This is a list of electoral results for the electoral district of Baroona in Queensland state elections.

Members for Baroona

Election results

Elections in the 1970s

Elections in the 1960s

Elections in the 1950s

Elections in the 1940s

Elections in the 1930s

References

Queensland state electoral results by district